Zara Morgan is a fictional character from the British Channel 4 soap opera Hollyoaks, played by Kelly Condron. The character initially appeared from 1 April 1999 to 22 December 2005. In July 2021, 15 years after her initial departure from
the soap, it was announced that Condron would be reprising her role as Zara from August 2021.

Casting and characterisation

Departure
In July 2005, it was announced that the serial's production team planned to write out some of their established characters. Kris Green of Digital Spy said he had heard that Condron's contract would not be renewed. In November, it was reported she had already finished filming with the series. Condron said that she was already pursuing other projects. Producers remained secretive about how they would write Zara out of the series. The character departed on 22 December 2005.

Reintroduction
On 19 July 2021, it was announced that Condron would return in August 2021 after a 16-year absence from Hollyoaks. It was stated by Hollyoaks that she had become an "eco-warrior" and that she had matured in her years away from the fictional village. Zara's return sees her arrive in Hollyoaks for the funeral of her mother Sue Morgan (Marian McLoughlin) through social media. After being approached by the Hollyoaks casting team, Condron felt that she could not refuse their offer of reprising her role as Zara. This was accredited to Zara becoming involved in an "important and relevant" storyline which piqued Condron's interest. Condron was happy to return to the serial and thanked the cast and crew for making her feel welcome; she felt that despite it being nearly 16 years since her exit, the environment of the set felt familiar. On her character's personality, Condron said that Zara returns "all grown up" as a keen environmentalist, but affirmed that she still has a fiery and outspoken nature.

Storylines

1999–2005
Zara arrives in the village with her family in April 1999, her father Andy Morgan (Ross Davidson) having purchased Deva in an attempt to repair his marriage to her mother Sue Morgan (Eve White), her brother Adam Morgan (David Brown) having been accepted to study at college, and Zara having been enrolled to attend Hollyoaks Comprehensive despite her record of expulsions. Zara's behaviour is driven by Andy and Sue’s failing marriage, and she would often create trouble by defying Andy and Sue at home, playing truant and bullying students at school. Zara supports Andy as he attempts to reconcile with Sue, but proceeds to make snide remarks and develops a hatred towards Sue when she decides that she wants to move on. Zara takes Sue's new relationship with a man named William very poorly and attempts to ruin their relationship. William puts up with Zara's extreme behaviour but the couple split when Sue finds out that William is married.

After Zara's brother Luke Morgan (Gary Lucy) is raped by Mark Gibbs (Colin Parry), Zara becomes the target of bullying by Steph Dean (Carley Stenson) and other students. Zara attempts to defend Luke, even attacking Steph in the school playground. The bullying exacerbates Zara's behaviour and she begins acting poorly towards her teachers. Accused by the teacher of stealing money after being caught going through her bag, Zara is informed by her headteacher that she is to be taken off the mural project in art class. A furious Zara then sets the mural on fire, which spreads to some flammables. In the aftermath, she is sent for a psychological assessment. In August 2000, Zara develops feelings for an older boy Paul Millington (Zander Ward), but he rejects her as she is only fourteen years old. Zara and Paul remain friends but Zara pretends that they are in a relationship. Her story gets out of hand when she lies that she has slept with Paul. Accusing Paul of statutory rape, Andy beats Paul to the point where he is hospitalised. Zara reveals the truth and Paul later leaves the village. Zara ends up becoming friends with Steph, and also befriends Abby Davies (Helen Noble) when she arrives in the village. Zara also befriends Lisa Hunter (Gemma Atkinson), who Steph takes a disliking to due to her popularity. Zara meets and falls for Brian Drake (Jonathan Le Billon), even becoming a goth in an attempt to please him. This works and Zara and Brian begin a relationship until Brian falls for Lisa and breaks up with Zara on Christmas Day 2001. An upset Zara turns against Lisa and begins bullying her along with Steph. However, Zara discovers that Lisa has been self-harming and ends up reconciling with her.

Zara's sister Beth Morgan (Kate Baines) is raped by ex-footballer Scott Anderson (Daniel Hyde) during Jason Cunliffe‘s (Alex Reid) party in November 2001. Supporting Beth, Zara is incensed when Steph starts dating Scott. Steph refuses to listen to Zara, even mocking Zara about the rape, to which Zara attacks her. Their friendship is left in tatters until Steph is allowed back into the friendship group after the group worry that she has been murdered by Toby Mills (Henry Luxemburg) in July 2002. Sue and Andy ended up reconciling and marry in October 2002. When Beth is released from prison for running over Scott with her car, Sue and Andy decide to move to France with her and Zara. Zara is infuriated that she was not given a choice like Luke and Adam were, but Abby invites her to stay with her, her brother Ben Davies (Marcus Patric) and their father Will Davies (Barny Clevely), which Zara accepts. Steph, who had taken charge of the friend group, begins pushing Zara, Abby, Lisa and her brother Lee Hunter (Alex Carter) to extremes. Steph starts a "rumour club", which proved to be the final straw, and the club is dissolved. Steph's reaction leads to her being kicked out of the group.

Zara visits Andy and Sue in France in 2003, meeting a man named Hugo, who follows her back to the village. Zara had only been interested in Hugo as she wanted to lose her virginity, but Hugo is infatuated by her to her embarrassment, only leaving when Zara makes it clear that she does not want to be with him. Despite being the boyfriend of Abby, Zara takes an interest in Lee, who uses Zara to make Abby jealous. However, after Abby leaves to study in Brighton and is caught being unfaithful by Lee, he begins a relatively short-term relationship with Zara. Deciding to study law at university, Zara falls for an uninterested Sam Owen (Louis Tamone) but ends up catching the eye of Freddy Watson (Greg Kelly). Zara begins a relationship with Freddy, but Freddy is a radical environmental activist, who sets fire to the media lab as part of an animal rights demonstration. Zara and Lee are accused of playing a role in the fire and are expelled by the University. They reconcile as Zara plans to move to Thailand to work for a charity. Lee ends up accompanying her and they leave the village together in 2005.

2021–present
In July 2021, Luke informs Zara of Sue's death. Zara turns up on Luke's doorstep in August 2021, having only learned of the funeral through social media, which she is not happy about. Luke and Zara soon reconcile, but Zara is devastated to learn that Luke has frontotemporal dementia. She is also shocked when Luke’s fiancée, Cindy Cunningham (Stephanie Waring), finds visiting orders to Stephen MacGregor, a member of Mark’s gang, in Sue's belongings. Luke finds out the truth but forgets due to his dementia. In November 2021, Zara is instrumental in a global warming campaign alongside Ripley Lennox (Ki Griffin) and Brooke Hathaway (Tylan Grant). She organizes a protest against light pollution and targets the village Christmas lights switch-on, leading to a feud with conspiracy theorist Becky Quentin (Katie McGlynn). When Becky disrupts the protest, Zara calls the police. Zara supports Cindy in aiding an ailing Luke, and on Cindy and Luke’s stag do in Mallorca, he falls from a cliff into the ocean and dies from his injuries. Zara competes with Tony Hutchinson (Nick Pickard) to run for council, supported by Scott Drinkwell (Ross Adams). Tony considers pulling out of the election when Zara campaigns for more support for dementia suffers in memory of Luke, but Tony wins the election and employees Zara as his PA.

References

External links
 Character profile at Hollyoaks.com

Hollyoaks characters
Teenage characters in television
Fictional conservationists and environmentalists
Fictional social workers
Television characters introduced in 1999
Female characters in television
Fictional vegan and vegetarian characters